Ha Yeon-soo (born Yoo Yeon-soo on October 10, 1990) is a South Korean actress.

Personal life 
On May 10, 2022, Ha's contract with the former agency has expired. and she traveled to Japan to study.

Filmography

Television series

Film

Variety shows

Music video appearances

Discography

Awards and nominations

References

1990 births
21st-century South Korean actresses
South Korean television actresses
South Korean film actresses
Living people
People from Busan